This is a list of places in the United States named for Dwight D. Eisenhower:

Education

Colleges and universities named after Dwight D. Eisenhower
Eisenhower College in Seneca Falls, New York, 1965–1983

Highways

Dwight D. Eisenhower System of Interstate and Defence Highways
Eisenhower Parkway in Essex County, New Jersey
Eisenhower Expressway (Interstate 290) near Chicago 
Eisenhower Tunnel on Interstate 70 west of Denver

Military facilities
Dwight D. Eisenhower Army Medical Center, located at Fort Gordon near Augusta, Georgia
Eisenhower Hall, the cadet activities building at West Point 
Eisenhower Monument at West Point
Chapel No. 1, the Eisenhower Memorial Chapel at the former Lowry Air Force Base in Denver, Colorado
Camp Eisenhower
Eisenhower Conference Centre, located at SHAPE (Supreme Headquarters Allied Powers Europe), Mons, Belgium
Fort Eisenhower, upon recommendation of the Naming Commission

Parks

Eisenhower State Park (Kansas)
Eisenhower State Park (Texas)

Sport
The Eisenhower Tree at the Augusta National Golf Club 
The Eisenhower Golf Club at the United States Air Force Academy
The 18th hole at Cherry Hills Country Club, near Denver

Landforms
Eisenhower Range in Victoria Land, Antarctica
Mount Eisenhower in the Presidential Range of the White Mountains (New Hampshire)

Military vessels
USS Dwight D. Eisenhower, the second Nimitz-class supercarrierDwight D. Eisenhower'', a British A4 class steam locomotive

Other
The Eisenhower Institute in Washington, D.C., a policy institute 
Dwight D. Eisenhower Memorial in Washington, D.C.
Eisenhower Birthplace State Historic Site in Denison, Texas
Eisenhower National Historic Site in Gettysburg, Pennsylvania
Eisenhower Executive Office Building, part of the White House Complex
The Eisenhower Medical Center in Rancho Mirage, California
Eisenhower Presidential Center, including the Eisenhower Presidential Library, in Abilene, Kansas
Eisenhower Avenue (WMATA station), rapid transit station in Alexandria, Virginia
Wichita Dwight D. Eisenhower National Airport, a commercial airport in Wichita, Kansas
Dwight D. Eisenhower (Brothers), National Statuary Hall Collection
The top floor of the Culzean Castle is named for Eisenhower

See also
Dwight D. Eisenhower#Tributes and memorials
Presidential memorials in the United States

References

Dwight D. Eisenhower
Eisenhower
Eisenhower, Dwight D.